América Futebol Clube, is a Brazilian association football club based in Morrinhos, Goiás. The club was founded on 5 March 1937.

Between 1959 and 1997 América played 14 times in the first division of the state championship of Goías, and in the second division until 2004.

After this, the club did not take part in any competitions. América returned to join the third state division in 2012. In 2013 the club achieved ascension to the second division.

Stadium
América Futebol Clube play their home games at Estádio do Centro Esportivo João Vilela. The stadium has a maximum capacity of 5,040 people.

Players

Squad 2021

Achievements

 Campeonato Goiano Second Level: 1987

References

Association football clubs established in 1937
Football clubs in Goiás
1937 establishments in Brazil